Dnipropetrovsk Oblast is subdivided into districts (raions) which are further subdivided into territorial communities (hromadas).

Current

On 18 July 2020, the number of districts was reduced to seven. These are:

 Dnipro (Дніпровський район), the center is in the city of Dnipro;
 Kamianske (Кам'янський район), the center is in the city of Kamianske;
 Kryvyi Rih (Криворізький район), the center is in the city of Kryvyi Rih;
 Nikopol (Нікопольський район), the center is in the city of Nikopol;
 Novomoskovsk (Новомосковський район), the center is in the city of Novomoskovsk;
 Pavlohrad (Павлоградський район), the center is in the city of Pavlohrad;
 Synelnykove (Синельниківський район), the center is in the city of Synelnykove.

Administrative divisions until 2020

Before July 2020, Dnipropetrovsk Oblast was subdivided into 35 regions: 22 districts (raions) and 13 city municipalities (mis'krada or misto), officially known as territories governed by city councils.

Cities under the oblast's jurisdiction:
Dnipro Municipality 
Cities  under the city's jurisdiction:
Dnipro (Дніпро), formerly Dnipropetrovsk, the administrative center of the oblast 
Urban-type settlements under the city's jurisdiction:
Aviatorske (Авіаторське)
Kamianske Municipality 
Cities  under the city's jurisdiction:
Kamianske (Кам'янське), formerly Dniprodzerzhynsk
Urban-type settlements under the city's jurisdiction:
Karnaukhivka (Карнаухівка)
Kryvyi Rih Municipality 
Cities  under the city's jurisdiction:
Kryvyi Rih (Кривий Ріг)
Marhanets Municipality 
Cities  under the city's jurisdiction:
Marhanets (Марганець)
Urban-type settlements under the city's jurisdiction:
Marivka (Мар'ївка)
Nikopol (Нікополь)
Novomoskovsk (Новомосковськ)
Pavlohrad (Павлоград)
Pershotravensk (Першотравенськ)
Pokrov Municipality 
Cities  under the city's jurisdiction:
Pokrov (Покров)
Urban-type settlements under the city's jurisdiction:
Chortomlyk (Чортомлик)
Hirnytske (Гірницьке)
Synelnykove (Синельникове)
Ternivka Municipality 
Cities under the city's jurisdiction:
Ternivka (Тернівка)
Vilnohirsk (Вільногірськ)
Zhovti Vody Municipality 
Cities under the city's jurisdiction:
Zhovti Vody (Жовті Води)
Districts (raions):
Apostolove (Апостолівський район)
Cities  under the district's jurisdiction:
Apostolove (Апостолове)
Zelenodolsk (Зеленодольськ)
Dnipro (Дніпровський район)
Cities  under the district's jurisdiction:
Pidhorodne (Підгородне)
Urban-type settlements under the district's jurisdiction:
Obukhivka (Обухівка), formerly Kirovske
Slobozhanske (Слобожанське), formerly Yuvileine
Krynychky (Криничанський район)
Urban-type settlements under the district's jurisdiction:
Auly (Аули)
Bozhedarivka (Божедарiвка), formerly Shchorsk
Krynychky (Кринички)
Kryvyi Rih (Криворізький район)
Urban-type settlements under the district's jurisdiction:
Khrystoforivka (Христофорівка)
Radushne (Радушне)
Mahdalynivka (Магдалинівський район)
Urban-type settlements under the district's jurisdiction:
Mahdalynivka (Магдалинівка)
Mezhova (Межівський район)
Urban-type settlements under the district's jurisdiction:
Demuryne (Демурине)
Mezhova (Межова)
Nikopol (Нікопольський район)
Urban-type settlements under the district's jurisdiction:
Chervonohryhorivka (Червоногригорівка)
Novomoskovsk (Новомосковський район)
Cities  under the district's jurisdiction:
Pereshchepyne (Перещепине)
Urban-type settlements under the district's jurisdiction:
Cherkaske (Черкаське)
Hubynykha (Губиниха)
Hvardiiske (Гвардійське)
Melioratyvne (Меліоративне)
Pavlohrad (Павлоградський район)
Petropavlivka (Петропавлівський район)
Urban-type settlements under the district's jurisdiction:
Petropavlivka (Петропавлівка)
Zaliznychne (Залізничне), formerly Bragynivka
Petrykivka (Петриківський район)
Urban-type settlements under the district's jurisdiction:
Kurylivka (Курилівка)
Mykolaivka (Миколаївка)
Petrykivka (Петриківка)
Piatykhatky (П'ятихатський район)
Cities under the district's jurisdiction:
Piatykhatky (П'ятихатки)
Urban-type settlements under the district's jurisdiction:
Lykhivka (Лихівка)
Vyshneve (Вишневе)
Pokrovske (Покровський район)
Urban-type settlements under the district's jurisdiction:
Pokrovske (Покровське)
Prosiana (Просяна)
Shyroke (Широківський район)
Urban-type settlements under the district's jurisdiction:
Shyroke (Широке)
Sofiivka (Софіївський район)
Urban-type settlements under the district's jurisdiction:
Sofiivka (Софіївка)
Solone (Солонянський район)
Urban-type settlements under the district's jurisdiction:
Novopokrovka (Новопокровка)
Solone (Солоне)
Synelnykove (Синельниківський район)
Urban-type settlements under the district's jurisdiction:
Ilarionove (Іларіонове)
Rozdory (Роздори)
Sad (Сад)
Slavhorod (Славгород)
Tomakivka (Томаківський район)
Urban-type settlements under the district's jurisdiction:
Tomakivka (Томаківка)
Tsarychanka (Царичанський район)
Urban-type settlements under the district's jurisdiction:
Tsarychanka (Царичанка)
Vasylkivka (Васильківський район)
Urban-type settlements under the district's jurisdiction:
Chaplyne (Чаплине)
Pysmenne (Письменне)
Vasylkivka (Васильківка)
Verkhnodniprovsk (Верхньодніпровський район)
Cities under the district's jurisdiction:
Verkhivtseve (Верхівцеве)
Verkhnodniprovsk (Верхньодніпровськ)
Urban-type settlements under the district's jurisdiction:
Dniprovske (Дніпровське)
Novomykolaivka (Новомиколаївка)
Yurivka (Юр'ївський район)
Urban-type settlements under the district's jurisdiction:
Yurivka (Юр'ївка)

References

Dnipropetrovsk